Sol or SOL may refer to:

Astronomy
 The Sun
 Mars sol, solar day on Mars

Currency

 SOL Project, a currency project in France
 French sol, or sou
 Argentine sol
 Bolivian sol, the currency of Bolivia from 1827 to 1864
 Peruvian sol, introduced in 1991
 Peruvian sol (1863–1985)
Solana (blockchain platform) (SOL), a cryptocurrency

Entertainment, arts and media

Music
 G (musical note) or sol, a note of the solfege music scale
 G major or sol, a musical key
 Sol (band), a Canadian indie rock band active in the 1990s
 Sol (album), an album by electronic musician Eskmo
 Sol, an album by Ougenweide
 Shit Out of Luck, a 1996 album by The Lillingtons

Gaming
 The Shadows of Luclin, sometimes referred to as SoL, an expansion to the Everquest computer game
 Sol Badguy, a character in the Guilty Gear video games
 Sol Squadron, an enemy squadron in the video game Ace Combat 7: Skies Unknown

Newspapers
 Sol (newspaper), a weekly newspaper published in Portugal
 soL (newspaper), a daily left-leaning newspaper published in Turkey

Other uses in arts and entertainment
 Sol (comedian), a creation of Marc Favreau
 Sol (film), a 2014 Canadian documentary
 Sol, a cat in Warriors (novel series)

Mythology
 Sol (Roman mythology), a Roman sun god
 Sól (Germanic mythology), a Germanic sun goddess

People
 Sol (given name), a given name
 Sol (Korean surname)
 Sol., author citation (botany) for Daniel Solander (1733–1782), Swedish botanical author
 Sol (musician), hip hop performer Sol Moravia-Rosenberg
 Oliver Lieb (born 1969), sometimes known as S.O.L., German electronic music producer and DJ
 Taeyang or SOL (born 1988), Korean singer

Science and technology

Computing
 Secure Operations Language
 Serial over LAN
 Simple Object Language, the ancestor of Lua programming language
 sol (format), a file format for presenting solutions of mathematical programming problems
 Sol-20, an early microcomputer produced by the Processor Technology Corporation
 Sol (laptop), a solar-powered laptop by WeWi Telecommunications
 .sol, a local shared object file format
 &sol;, the XML/HTML character entity for the slash (punctuation)

Medicine
 Sleep onset latency - length of time of the transition from full wakefulness to sleep
 Space-occupying lesion of the brain can be caused by different pathology such as a malignancy, an abscess or a haematoma

Other uses in science and technology
 Sol (colloid), a type of suspension
 Sol geometry, a three-dimensional Riemannian manifold

Sports
 Austin Sol, an American Ultimate Disc League team
 Los Angeles Sol, a defunct professional soccer team
 Miami Sol, a defunct Women's National Basketball Association team
 Sonoma County Sol, an American soccer team

Transportation
 Sol (car marque), a car brand in the Chinese market
 Sol Líneas Aéreas, an airline in Argentina
 Sol Linhas Aéreas, an airline in Brazil
 Sol (Madrid Metro), a station on Line 1, 2 and 3
 Solana Beach station, a train station serving Solana Beach, California
 Stratford–Okahukura Line, a secondary railway line in New Zealand
 Honda CR-X del Sol, a small car manufactured by Honda

Other uses
 Statute of limitations, in criminal prosecution
 Skilled Occupation List, skilled occupations acceptable for migration to Australia
 Standards of Learning, a set of standards Virginia students must meet before graduation
 California State Prison, Solano (SOL), United States
 Service d'ordre légionnaire, a collaborationist militia in Vichy France
 Soľ, a village in eastern Slovakia
 Sol (river), a river in Russia
 Society for Organizational Learning, an American organization working on corporate sustainability
 Sol, an additional summer month in the proposed International Fixed Calendar
 Sol, a beer produced by the Cuauhtémoc Moctezuma Brewery
 Senator On-Line, an Australian political party
 The Social Liberals (Austria), a minor political party

See also
El Sol (disambiguation)
Sól (disambiguation)
Sols (disambiguation)
Sol Invictus (disambiguation)
Sole (disambiguation)
Soul (disambiguation)